Khirbat al-Muntar was a Palestinian Arab village in the Safad Subdistrict. It was depopulated during the 1948 Arab-Israeli War by Palmach's First Battalion and 'Oded Brigade of Operation Yiftach after resistance by the Syrian Army. It was located 8.5 km east of Safad.

History
In 1838, Edward Robinson noted al-Muntar as an encampment of Turkish and Kurdish nomads.

At the end of the 19th century, much of the land was purchased by Baron Rothschild, and Mahanayim was  established in 1898 on former Khirbat al-Muntar land. Mahanayim failed and was abandoned, but reestablished in 1939.

In the 1945 statistics, during the  British Mandate of Palestine, Khirbat al-Muntar  was counted under Mahanayim, and Arabs owned only  52 dunams out of a  total of 2,472 dunums of land.  All of the 52  dunums were for used cereals.

References

Bibliography

External links
 Welcome To al-Muntar, Khirbat
   Khirbat al-Muntar, Villages of Palestine.
 Khirbat al-Muntar, Zochrot
Survey of Western Palestine, Map 4: IAA, Wikimedia commons

Arab villages depopulated during the 1948 Arab–Israeli War
District of Safad